The 1984 United States Senate election in Arkansas was held on November 6, 1984. Incumbent Democratic U.S. Senator David Pryor won re-election to a second term.

Candidates

Democratic
  David Pryor, incumbent Senator

Republican
  Ed Bethune, U.S. Representative

Results

See also 
 1984 United States Senate elections

References 

Arkansas
1984
1984 Arkansas elections